Sannikovo is a rural locality (a selo) and the administrative center of Sannikovsky Selsoviet, Pervomaysky District, Altai Krai, Russia. The population was 2,720 as of 2013. There are 101 streets.

Geography 
Sannikovo is located 12 km south of Novoaltaysk (the district's administrative centre) by road. Firsovo-3 is the nearest rural locality.

References 

Rural localities in Pervomaysky District, Altai Krai